The 15th National Film Awards, presented by Ministry of Information and Broadcasting, India to felicitate the best of Indian Cinema released in 1967. Ceremony took place at Vigyan Bhavan, New Delhi on 25 November 1968 and awards were given by then President of India, Zakir Hussain.

With 15th National Film Awards, format of awards has been changed, which includes introduction of new awards and categorisation. Unlike earlier, films then categorised into feature films and short films. Feature films awards were continued with All India Awards and Regional Awards but couple of more awards were introduced at the all India level to honour artists and technicians.

Major awards introduced for feature films starting with 15th National Film Awards includes awards for Best Actor, Best Actress, Best Direction, Best Cinematography, Best Music Direction, Best Playback Singer of the Year and Best Screenplay.

Starting 15th National Film Awards, Short films had their own share of awards which introduced seven new awards for various types/genre of short films made in the country, including Best Promotional Film, Best Educational / Instructional Film, Best Film on Social Documentation etc.

Certificate of Merit in all the categories is discontinued with 15th National Film Awards, which also led to discontinuation of second and third film/documentary, again in all the categories, except Second Best Feature Film.

Juries 

Six different committees were formed based on the film making sectors in India, mainly based in Bombay, Calcutta and Madras along with the award categories. Another committee for all India level was also formed which included some of the members from regional committee. For 15th National Film Awards, central committee was headed by R. K. Nehru.

 Jury Members: Central
 R. K. Nehru (Chairperson)Ammu SwaminathanAdya RangacharyaArdhendu MukerjeeB. V. SingaracharyaRoshan Lal MalhotraSunder Lal NahataJainendra KumarAli Sardar JafriM. Mujeeb
 Jury Members: Documentary
 Padmaja Naidu (Chairperson)Muriel WasiJ. D. SinghR. S. SharmaLen Chatwin
 Jury Members: Short Films
 Krishna Kriplani (Chairperson)Tara Ali BaigShiv S. KapurEbrahim AlkaziUsha BhagatFali Bilimoria
 Jury Regional: Bombay
 V. A. Naik (Chairperson)Aloo J. ChibberAnant KanekarR. SrinivasanRam JoshiK. J. KhambattaBhanu Prasad PandyaPannalal MaheshwarySadashiv J. Row KaviBany Talwar
 Jury Regional: Calcutta
 S. N. Ray (Chairperson)Premendra MitraRita RayR. P. GuptaJamuna BaruahSachidananda Raut RayAsim PalD. K. SircarDurgadas Mitra
 Jury Regional: Madras
 C. R. Pattabhiraman (Chairperson)A. N. Krishna RaoDevaki GopidasK. SubramaniamS. K. NayarD. V. S. RajuT. E. VasudevanV. C. SubburamanB. AnanthaswamiD. N. Rao

Awards 

Awards were divided into feature films and non-feature films.

President's Gold Medal for the All India Best Feature Film is now better known as National Film Award for Best Feature Film, whereas President's Gold Medal for the Best Documentary Film is analogous to today's National Film Award for Best Non-Feature Film. For children's films, Prime Minister's Gold Medal is now given as National Film Award for Best Children's Film. At the regional level, President's Silver Medal for Best Feature Film is now given as National Film Award for Best Feature Film in a particular language. Certificate of Merit in all the categories is discontinued over the years.

Feature films 

Feature films were awarded at All India as well as regional level. For 15th National Film Awards, a Bengali film Hatey Bazarey won the President's Gold Medal for the All India Best Feature Film, whereas a Bengali film Chiriyakhana and two Hindi films, Hamraaz and Upkar won the maximum number of awards (two). Following were the awards given in each category:

All India Award 

Following were the awards given:

Regional Award 

The awards were given to the best films made in the regional languages of India. For feature films in Assamese, English, Gujarati, Kashmiri and Oriya language, President's Silver Medal for Best Feature Film was not given. The producer and director of the film were awarded with 5,000 and a Silver medal, respectively.

Non-Feature films 

Following were the awards given:

Short films

Awards not given 

Following were the awards not given as no film was found to be suitable for the award:

 Best Feature Film on National Unity and Emotional Integration
 Prime Minister's Gold Medal for the Best Children's Film
 President's Silver Medal for Best Feature Film in Assamese
 President's Silver Medal for Best Feature Film in English
 President's Silver Medal for Best Feature Film in Oriya

References

External links 
 National Film Awards Archives
 Official Page for Directorate of Film Festivals, India

National Film Awards (India) ceremonies
1968 film awards
1968 in Indian cinema